The Autonomous Robot Architecture (AuRA) is a hybrid deliberative/reactive robot architecture developed by American roboticist and roboethicist Ronald C. Arkin at the Georgia Institute of Technology. It was developed in mid-1980s. AuRA is one of the first Hybrid Robotic Architecture developed. Hybrid Robotic Architecture forms form combination of reactive and deliberative approaches and gets best from both the approaches.

See also 
 Three-layer architecture
 Servo, subsumption, and symbolic architecture
 Distributed architecture for mobile navigation (DAMN)
 ATLANTIS architecture

References

https://web.archive.org/web/20120325145948/http://math.haifa.ac.il/robotics/Projects/AuRA_Ina.pdf
Robot architectures